Manuela González (born January 14, 1977, in Santa fe de Bogotá, Colombia), is a Colombian actress and model. She is best known for her roles in telenovelas such as  Me llaman Lolita, El Inútil, Ángel de la guarda, mi dulce compañía, La Saga, negocio de familia, and En los tacones de Eva. In 2009 she starred in the telenovela La bella Ceci y el imprudente, in which shared credits with Julián Román. In 2013 she joined the TV series El Señor de los Cielos, which lasted two seasons.

Filmography

References

External links 

20th-century Colombian actresses
Colombian telenovela actresses
Colombian female models
1977 births
Living people
21st-century Colombian actresses
Actresses from Bogotá